The All-time Pittsburgh Riverhounds SC roster is a list of all players who have participated in at least one league match for Pittsburgh Riverhounds SC since the USL began keeping archived records in 2003. Players who were on the roster but never played a first-team game are not listed; players who appeared for the team in other competitions (US Open Cup, CONCACAF Champions League, etc.) but never actually made an USL appearance are noted at the bottom of the page where appropriate.

 

Key
† – denotes players who only appeared in a single match.
* – denotes players who are known to have appeared for the team prior to 2003.

A
  Kevin Alvero
  Samuel Appiah
  Mike Apple

B
  Brian Bajek
  Jeremy Ballenger
  Devlin Barnes
  Vinny Bastidas
  Gabe Bernstein
  Tim Bezbatchenko
  Walter Blake
  Tenywa Bonseu
  Cody Bragg
  Bill Brindley
  Allan Brown
  Leon Browne
  Sean Bucknor
  Mike Butler

C
  Anthony Calvano
  Sean Cameron
  Franz Carr *
  Joenal Castma
  Ryan Caugherty
  Granit Caushaj
  Romain Cheurlin
  Greg Chevalier
 *   Edward Child
  Matt Chulis
  Jason Connell

D
  Randy Dedini
  Gary DePalma
  Paul Dolinsky
  Paul Dougherty *

E
  Allen Eller
  Justin Evans

F
  Adam Fedoruk *
  David Flavius

G
  Ali Gerba
  Ted Giannacopolous
  Scott Gibson
  Tim Glowienka
  Mario Gori
  Thomas Gray
  Michael Green (born 1978)
  Michael Green (born 1989)
  Henry Gutierrez

H
  Emil Haitonic (On 1 May 1999, Emil scored the first goal in the history of the club)
  TJ Hanning
  Dan Hartung
  Ed Hayden
  Lucas Heasley
  Jeff Houser
  Jeff Hughes
  Dave Husbands

I
  Ricardo Iribarren
  Ezenwa Ihekoronye

J
  Brent Jacquette
  Greg Janicki
  Jean-Robens Jerome
  Randolph Jerome
  Brian Johnson
  John Jones

K
  Phil Karn
  Nikola Katic
  Andrew Keszler
  Thabiso Khumalo
  Chuck Kim
  Leidy Klotz
  Aleksey Korol
  Reggie Koranteng
  Dave Kovalcik
  Terry Krause
  Jason Kutney
  Travis Kruse

L
  Tony Labudovski
  Matt Langton
  Ryan Leven 
  John Liersemann

M
  Derek MacKenzie
  Travis MacKenzie
  Ahmad Manning
  Phil Marfuggi
  Thiago Martins *
  Terry McNelis
  Matthew Mehler
  Stephen Mellor
  Bobby Meyer *
  Bryan Monka
  Mira Mupier

N

O
  Eric Ongao

P
  Doug Petras
  Dereck Potteiger
  Damien Pottinger

R
  Chris Riley
  Chris Robinson
  Kevin Romasco

S
  Tim Sahaydak
  Nathan Salsi
  Rodrigo Saravia
  Tiest Sondaal
  Tyler Suffron

T
  Nicholas Terlecki
  Evaud Thompson
  Aaron Thomas
  Josh Thornton
  Jaman Tripoli
  Lee Tshantret

V
  Zach Varga
  Goran Vasic
  Gregory Victor
  Ricardo Villar
  Joseph Vidmar

W
  Danny Waltman
  Corey Woolfolk
  Joey Worthen *
  David Wright

Z
  Ryan Zabinski
  Joe Zewe

Others
  José Burciaga, Jr. - Played one U.S. Open Cup game in 2001.

Sources

+
Lists of soccer players by club in the United States
Association football player non-biographical articles
Pittsburgh Riverhounds SC players